El Fadila  may refer to:

El Vadila, a political party in Mauritania
Islamic Virtue Party, a political party in Iraq
Virtue Party (Egypt)